Cathedral Preparatory School (often referred to simply as Prep) is a private, Roman Catholic, college-preparatory high school for boys in Erie, Pennsylvania, United States. It was established in 1921 by Archbishop John Mark Gannon and is located in the Roman Catholic Diocese of Erie.

History 

On Friday, August 12, 1921, Bishop John Mark Gannon summoned the pastors of Erie's twelve parishes to meet to discuss the "lack of Catholic education for high school boys in the city." "Many Catholics," he claimed, "although highly intelligent and deserving, were denied the chance to receive a preparatory education because they were poor." His goal was to establish a school that "provided the moral, intellectual, social, and physical training designed to prepare (men) to live in our democratic society..." thus, the Cathedral Preparatory School for Boys was established in the fall of 1921. The new school's location was in the hastily remodeled basement of St. Peter's Cathedral. The faculty consisted of four priests and one layperson. Tuition was $50 and paid for by the students' parishes. In 1925, the first graduating class of 43 men became alums. In 1929, Bill Ring of the Erie Dispatch-Herald began referring to the Cathedral team as the "Ramblers." Mr. Ring's inspiration was the University of Notre Dame's 1920's nickname. 

The school renovated the halls and classrooms of all four floors in its main building. The project, which included the installation of new windows, ceilings, walls, lockers, lighting fixtures, carpeting, and technology infrastructure, has a projected completion cost of three million dollars. It recently completed a $1 million renovation to the science wing and auditorium. On September 10, 2010, it officially opened the Cathedral Prep Events Center (now known as the Hagerty Family Events Center ), a new athletic complex for football, basketball, swimming, water polo, soccer, lacrosse, and track and field. A 1,800 seat gymnasium and a 400-seat natatorium complete with an Olympic-sized pool, a new wrestling room, and a weight room were recently completed on the corner of 12th and Cherry Streets for a cost of over $10 million.

Admissions

Demographics

Curriculum 
Students must take courses in English, history, mathematics, religion, foreign languages, and science and are also required to complete 100 hours of community service. Additionally, every student must take the SAT to graduate. Cathedral Prep bases acceptance to the first-year class on the results of the mandatory entrance exam, elementary school transcripts, school disciplinary records, and recommendations from the elementary school teachers and principal. In 2019, 127 students graduated from Cathedral Preparatory School, and 100% of the graduating class was accepted into a four-year college.

Extracurricular activities

Athletics 
The school is a member of the Pennsylvania Interscholastic Athletic Association  (PIAA) in PIAA District 10. Prep offers 13 varsity sports as well as many JV and freshman sports. On September 10, 2010, it officially opened the Cathedral Prep Events Center, a new athletic complex for football. Each year its basketball team hosts the Burger King Classic.

Student section 
The school's student cheering section, particularly at football and basketball games, is widely known.

Notable alumni

References

External links 
 

Education in Erie, Pennsylvania
Schools in Erie County, Pennsylvania
Catholic secondary schools in Pennsylvania
Boys' schools in the United States
Educational institutions established in 1921
1921 establishments in Pennsylvania